Bhagirathi Parbat II (Hindi: भागीरथी पर्वत II) is a mountain in Uttarakhand India. It's the 85th highest located entirely within the Uttarakhand India. Nanda Devi, is the highest mountain in this category. Its second highest peak in the Bhagirathi Massif. The summits is 6512 meter or 21365 feet. It was first climbed by Austrians Edi Ellmauthaler and Toni Messner in 1933.

Climbing history

It was first ascent by Austrians Edi Ellmauthaler and Toni Messner in 1933. The first Indian success on this peak came on 20 October 1966. Govinda Raj, Amar Ray, and two Sherpas, Karma and Gyalboo climbed to the summit after a ten hour of difficult climb. while coming back from summit in a freak accident Amar Ray, and two Sherpas Karma and Gyalboo died while Govinda Raj got frostbite.

Neighboring and subsidiary peaks

From left to right Vasuki Parbat, Bhagirathi Parbat II, IV, III, I neighboring peaks
Bhagirathi Parbat II neighboring or subsidiary peaks:
 Bhagirathi Parbat I, 6,856 m (22493 ft)
Satopanth, 7,075m (23,212 ft), 
 Vasuki Parbat, 6,792m (22,283 ft), 
 Bhagirathi Parbat III, 6,454 m (21175 ft)

Glaciers and rivers
The Gangotri Glacier on the east side and Vasuki Glacier on the west side and Chaturangi Glacier on the north. From the snout of Gangotri Glacier emerges Bhagirathi river also called Ganga or Ganges.

See also
 List of Himalayan peaks of Uttarakhand

References

Mountains of Uttarakhand
Six-thousanders of the Himalayas
Geography of Chamoli district